Shane Keith Warne  (13 September 1969 – 4 March 2022) was an Australian international cricketer whose career ran from 1991 to 2007. Warne played as a right-arm leg spin bowler and a right-handed batsman for Victoria, Hampshire and Australia. Considered to be one of the greatest bowlers in the history of the sport, he made 145 Test appearances, taking 708 wickets, and set the record for the most wickets taken by any bowler in Test cricket, a record he held until 2007.

Warne was a useful lower-order batsman who scored more than 3,000 Test runs, with a highest score of 99. He retired from international cricket at the end of Australia's 2006–07 Ashes series victory over England.

In the first four seasons of the Indian Premier League (IPL), Warne was a player-coach for Rajasthan Royals and also captained the team. During his career, Warne was involved in off-field scandals; his censures included a ban from cricket for testing positive for a prohibited substance and charges of sexual indiscretions and bringing the game into disrepute. Warne was a loved figure globally, with a huge following in every cricket nation. Alongside Warnie, his other nicknames and phrases of endearment included  The King, Baron of Baked Beans, Suicide, Sunshine, Big Blond, Lion, Caveman, The Sheikh of Tweak, Hollywood, The King of Spin, The Earl of Twirl,  The Murali of Melbourne, and Twistie.

Warne revolutionised cricket thinking with his mastery of leg spin, then regarded as a dying art. After retirement, he regularly worked as a cricket commentator and for charities and endorsed commercial products. In recognition of his skill, a statue of Warne bowling was placed outside the Melbourne Cricket Ground (MCG), where he was also honoured with a state memorial service, as well as having a grandstand named in his honour. Warne was posthumously appointed as an Officer of the Order of Australia (AO) for his service to cricket.

Early life
Warne was born in Upper Ferntree Gully, Victoria, a suburb of Melbourne, on 13 September 1969, the son of Brigitte and Keith Warne. His mother was German. He attended Hampton High School from Grades 7–9 before being offered a sports scholarship to attend Mentone Grammar, where he spent his final three years of school.

Early career
Warne's first representative honours came in the 1983–84 season when he represented University of Melbourne Cricket Club in the Victorian Cricket Association's under-16 Dowling Shield competition. He bowled a mixture of leg-spin and off-spin, and was a handy lower-order batsman.

The following season, Warne joined St Kilda Cricket Club, which is located near his home suburb Black Rock. He started in the lower elevens and, over a number of seasons, progressed to the first eleven. During the cricket off-season in 1987, Warne played five games of Australian rules football for St Kilda Football Club's under-19 team. In 1988, Warne again played for the St Kilda Football Club's under-19 team before being promoted to the reserves team, one step below professional level. Following the 1988 Victorian Football League season, St Kilda delisted Warne and he began to focus solely on cricket. In 1990, Warne was chosen to train at the Australian Cricket Academy in Adelaide.

In 1991, Warne moved to the UK and joined Accrington Cricket Club of the Lancashire League as their professional player for that year's cricket season. After initially struggling in English conditions, he had a good season as a bowler, taking 73 wickets at 15.4 runs each but scored only 329 runs at an average of 15. The committee at Accrington decided not to re-engage Warne for the 1992 season because they expected their professional to contribute as both a batsman and bowler.

Domestic career

Warne made his first-class cricket debut on 15 February 1991, taking 0/61 and 1/41 for Victoria against Western Australia at Junction Oval in Melbourne.

Warne signed a $400,000 contract to play for Hampshire County Cricket Club in England for the 2000 season. He returned to Hampshire as the captain for the seasons between 2004 and 2007. For Hampshire he scored his only two first class centuries and took 276 wickets at an average of 25.58.

International career

Early international career (1991–1993)
Warne was selected for the Australia B team, which toured Zimbabwe in September 1991. In the second tour match at Harare Sports Club, Warne recorded his first first-class score of five-wickets-or-more in an innings when he took 7/49 in the second innings, helping Australia B to a nine-wicket win.

In December 1991, upon returning to Australia, Warne took 3/14 and 4/42 for Australia A against a touring West Indian side. Peter Taylor, the incumbent spinner in the Australian Test team, had taken only one wicket in the first two Tests, so Warne was brought into the team for the third Test against India at the Sydney Cricket Ground a week later.

Warne had played in seven first-class matches before making his Test-level debut for Australia. He was called into the Australian team in January 1992 for a Test against India at Sydney Cricket Ground (SCG). He took 1/150 (Ravi Shastri caught by Dean Jones for 206) off 45 overs.

Warne took 0/78 in the fourth Test in Adelaide, recording overall figures of 1/228 for the series, and was rejected for the fifth Test on the pace-friendly WACA Ground in Perth. Warne's poor form continued in the first innings against Sri Lanka at Colombo, in which he recorded 0/107.

On 22 August 1992, however, Warne took the last three Sri Lankan wickets without conceding a run in the second innings, leading to a second-innings collapse and contributing to a 16-run Australian win. Sri Lankan captain Arjuna Ranatunga commented in an interview; "a bowler with Test average of more than 300 came and snatched the victory from our hands".

Despite his match-winning spell, Warne was left out of the second Sri Lanka test before taking 0/40 in the third-and-final test of the series. Warne was again left out of the First Test against the West Indies in the 1992–93 Australian season. Greg Matthews played in Warne's place; despite Australia being in a strong position on the final day, they could not dismiss the West Indies on a turning surface. Warne was recalled for the Second Test in Melbourne, a Boxing Day Test in which he took 7/52 in a match-winning performance in the second innings.

Path to 300 Test wickets (1993–1999)
In 1993, Warne was selected for Australia's Ashes tour of England, in which he was the leading wicket-taker for the six-Test series, with 34. His first ball of the series was called the "Ball of the Century", bowling the experienced English batsman Mike Gatting with a ball that turned from well-outside leg stump to clip the off bail. Warne took 71 Test wickets in 1993, a then-record for a spin bowler in a calendar year. New Zealand batsmen significantly contributed to his tally. Early in 1993, Warne took 17 wickets in Australia's tour of New Zealand, tying Danny Morrison with 17 as the top wicket-taker for the series. When New Zealand toured Australia for three Tests in November and December, Warne took 18 wickets and was named "player of the series".

Warne featured in South Africa's tour of Australia in 1993–94 and Australia's return tour in March 1994. In the second Test of South Africa's tour at the SCG, Warne took ten wickets in a Test for the first time in his career. His 7/56 in the first innings and 5/72 in the second was not enough to secure victory for Australia; on the Test's final day, Warne was part of an Australian batting collapse and South Africa won the Test. He was named one of the Wisden Cricketers of the Year in the 1994 Wisden Cricketers' Almanack.

Australia sought to retain the Ashes when England toured for a five-Test series in 1994–95. Warne took a career-best 8/71 in the second innings of the first Test at Brisbane Cricket Ground (the Gabba), before taking 27 wickets in the five-Test series. In the Second Test, a Boxing Day Test at Melbourne Cricket Ground (MCG), he took his first-and-only Test hat-trick, dismissing tail-enders Phil DeFreitas, Darren Gough and Devon Malcolm in successive balls, the last of which was caught by David Boon. Warne also took his 150th test wicket, a caught-and-bowled off Alec Stewart. Warne secured the Ashes for Australia with the bat. In the Third Test at SCG, he and fellow tail-ender Tim May survived the final 19 overs in fading light on the fifth day to secure a draw and a 2–0 series lead that meant Australia would retain the Ashes regardless of the result of the fourth and fifth Tests. Later in 1995, Warne toured the West Indies, taking 15 wickets in four Tests as Australia defeated the West Indies in a Test series for the first time in almost 20 years.

In the southern-hemisphere summer of 1995–96, Australia played a home series against Pakistan and Sri Lanka. Warne took 11 wickets in the first Test against Pakistan but broke his toe in the second. Selectors included him in the squad for the third Test days later to give him the chance to prove his fitness. Warne took four wickets in Pakistan's first innings and another four in their second, and was named the player of the series.

Warne was a key member of Australia's squad for the 1996 Cricket World Cup, which was held in India, Pakistan and Sri Lanka. Warne took 12 wickets, including a man-of-the-match 4/36 in the semi-final against the West Indies, and Australia qualified for the final. Before the final against Sri Lanka, Australian captain Mark Taylor publicly said Warne was not "vital" to his team and that Warne alone could not win the World Cup. Warne conceded 58 runs for no wickets in the final; Australia lost the match to first-time champions Sri Lanka.

The West Indies toured Australia for a five-Test series in the southern-hemisphere summer of 1996–97. Warne took 22 wickets in the series, and a further 11 in Australia's three-Test tour of South Africa in early 1997. In the northern summer of 1997, Warne returned to England with the Australian team to play for the Ashes. After struggling for form early in the tour, Warne took 24 wickets at an average of 24.04 and Australia won the six-Test series 3–2.

In the Australian summer of 1997–98, Warne took 19 wickets in New Zealand's three-Test series in Australia and 20 wickets in three Tests against South Africa, in the second of which he took five wickets in the first innings and six in the second, becoming the second Australian after Dennis Lillee to take 300 Test wickets. In late 1997, Australian media criticised Warne for his weight; however, The Australian wrote he was one of Australia's three most-influential cricketers, the others being Donald Bradman and Lillee. Journalist and former English cricketer Derek Pringle said Warne passed the 300-Test-wicket mark at the age of 28; "we are in the presence of true greatness and not some pretender to the great figures in the game's history".

Later in 1998, Warne was a member of Australia's touring squad of India. Finding Indian food not to his liking, he had tinned spaghetti and baked beans flown in from Australia. Australia's two top pace bowlers Glenn McGrath and Jason Gillespie missed the tour due to injury so Warne bowled more often than usual. He took 10 wickets but conceding 54 runs each, going for 0/147 in India's only innings of the second-and-series-winning Test in Calcutta. Warne's dismissal of Rahul Dravid in the first innings of the final test at Bangalore took him past Lance Gibbs' tally of 309 wickets, making Warne the most-successful spin bowler in Test Cricket. Australia lost the series, breaking a run of nine Test-series wins.

In early December 1998, the Australian Cricket Board (ACB) said three years earlier it had fined Warne and Mark Waugh for accepting money from a bookmaker for information about pitch and weather conditions; this was called the John the bookmaker controversy.

After suffering a shoulder injury, Warne returned to international cricket in the fifth Test of the Ashes series in Australia in January 1999. He missed Australia's tour of Pakistan and the first four Ashes Tests. During Warne's extended absence from the Australian team, his understudy Stuart MacGill played in his place, taking 15 wickets in three Tests against Pakistan and another series-high 27 wickets against England. Upon Warne's return, he and MacGill bowled in tandem to the team for the fifth Ashes Test at SCG, where MacGill took twelve wickets and Warne two.

Vice-captaincy of Australia (1999–2000)

The 1999–2000 Ashes series was the last for Australian captain Mark Taylor, who retired. Steve Waugh was appointed as Taylor's replacement while Warne was promoted to vice-captain. Warne, however, was dropped from the Test team during Australia's tour of the West Indies in early 1999. Warne took two wickets in the first three Tests of the series, leading to calls for his removal from the team from Australian media. For the final test, Warne was replaced by off-spinner Colin Miller, who with MacGill took eight wickets between them and Australia won the Test to retain the Frank Worrell Trophy. Warne's form recovered in the One Day International (ODI) series against the West Indies, and he was selected to play in the 1999 World Cup in the United Kingdom.

Just before the start of the 1999 World Cup, the International Cricket Council (ICC) fined Warne gave him a two-match suspended ban by for talking to a newspaper about Sri Lankan captain Arjuna Ranatunga, saying; "There is plenty of animosity between Arjuna and myself. I don't like him and I'm not in a club of one." Australia wanted to win their first Cricket World Cup since 1987. Warne took 12 wickets in the preliminary phases of the tournament, and Australia qualified for a semi-final against South Africa. The semi-final match became notable for the dramatic fashion in which it finished; Warne was the man of the match, dismissing key South African batsmen Herschelle Gibbs, Gary Kirsten, Hansie Cronje and Jacques Kallis. Australia faced Pakistan in the tournament's final. Pakistan batted first and were all out for 132; Warne took 4/33. Australia comfortably reached the target to win the World Cup. Warne was the tournament's joint-top wicket-taker with Geoff Allott, and was named the man of the match in the final.

After his World Cup performances, Warne was retained as Australia's vice-captain for tours of Sri Lanka and Zimbabwe later in 1999. The following Australian summer, he played in all Tests of the series against Pakistan and India. He reached his highest score with the bat in the first Test against Pakistan in Brisbane, with 86, before matching that score in the first Test against India in Adelaide the following month. Warne's performances in the Brisbane Test were overshadowed by the Joe the Cameraman controversy, in which an off-field microphone picked up a jibe about the abilities of Australian bowler Scott Muller during the match. A Channel Nine cameraman subsequently confessed to making the "can't bowl, can't throw" remark many had believed was made by Warne. Warne took 18 wickets over the six summer Tests and Australia won both series 3–0. He then took another 15 wickets in Australia's 3–0 tour of New Zealand in March 2000. In the first Test of the series at Eden Park, Auckland. Warne surpassed Dennis Lillee's 355 wickets as Australia's leading-ever wicket-taker.

In 2000, Warne joined English county side Hampshire, for which he played during the year's northern-hemisphere summer. During the county season, reports Warne had repeatedly sent lewd SMS messages to an English nurse emerged. In August 2000, the ACB removed him as Australia's vice-captain, citing his history of off-field indiscretions. The board's decision was contrary to the wishes of the team's selectors, including captain Steve Waugh. Warne was replaced as vice-captain by Adam Gilchrist. That year, however, the ACB awarded Warne the Men's ODI Player of the Year at the Allan Border Medal ceremony.

Wickets and injuries (2001–2003)
Warne missed the entire Australian summer of 2000–01 with a finger injury; he battled Stuart MacGill and an in-form Colin Miller to be selected for Australia's tour of India in early 2001. MacGill was ultimately left out of the squad. Warne took 10 wickets over the three-Test series at an average of 50.50; his Indian spin counterpart Harbhajan Singh was the man of the series after taking 32 wickets at an average of 17.03. Australia lost the series 2–1. In the northern summer of 2001, Warne was chosen for his third Ashes tour and took 31 wickets in the five-Test series, which Australia won 4–1. He took three five-wicket hauls in the series. In the final Test at The Oval, Warne took 11 wickets across both innings, including the 400th wicket of his Test career from Alec Stewart. Warne became the sixth person and the first Australian in the history of cricket to reach 400 wickets.

In the 2001–02 Australian summer, Australia played home series against New Zealand and against South Africa. Warne took six wickets in three Tests against New Zealand, and in the third Test in Perth made his career's highest batting score in international cricket. He was caught at mid-wicket off the bowling of Daniel Vettori, which later revealed to be a no-ball while on 99 runs—one run short of a maiden Test century. He took 17 wickets in the three Tests against South Africa—more than any other player—including a five-wicket haul (5/113) in the first innings of the first Test. Warne, with 20 dismissals, was again the leading wicket-taker when Australia played a three-Test series in South Africa in February and March 2002. In February 2002, Ricky Ponting replaced Steve Waugh as captain of Australia's ODI squad. The promotion of Ponting, who was five years younger than Warne, appeared to end any prospect of Warne ever being appointed to the captaincy of Australia.

In October 2002, Australia played a three-Test series against Pakistan in neutral states Sri Lanka and the United Arab Emirates. Warne, who had lost weight over the previous months, took 27 wickets, was named the player of the series, and was man of the match in the first Test with 11 wickets; and the third Test with eight wickets. He returned to Australia for the 2002 – 03 Ashes series against England, starting in November 2002. In the first Test, he scored 57 with the bat and took 11 wickets in the first three Tests of the series but suffered a shoulder injury in an ODI in December 2002. The injury ruled him out of the remainder of the Ashes series and him in doubt for the World Cup, which would begin in February 2003.

Ban from cricket (2003)
In February 2003, a day before the start of the World Cup, Warne was sent home after a drug test during a one-day series in Australia returned a positive result for a banned diuretic. Warne said he took only one of what he called a "fluid tablet"—the prescription drug Moduretic—which his mother had given him to improve his appearance. A committee established by the ACB found Warne guilty of breaching the board's drug code and imposed a one-year ban from organised cricket.

After having announced he would retire from ODIs after the 2003 World Cup, Warne took the view the ban would lengthen his Test-playing career, although it led him to briefly reconsider his decision to retire from ODIs. Warne was allowed to play in charity matches while serving his one-year ban, a decision that was criticised by the World Anti-Doping Agency (WADA), which Warne criticised for interfering in the matter.

During his suspension, Australia's main free-to-air cricket broadcaster Nine Network hired Warne as a television commentator. During mid-2003, Warne worked for the St Kilda Football Club, an Australian rules football club, in an unpaid consultancy role after the Australian Football League (AFL) banned him from holding an official club position because of his drugs ban.

Return to cricket (2004–2006)
Warne returned to competitive cricket following his ban in February 2004. In March, in the first Test of a three-Test series against Sri Lanka in Galle, he became the second cricketer after Courtney Walsh to take 500 Test wickets. Warne took five wickets in each innings of the first and second Tests, and a further six wickets in the third Test, and was named the player of the series. on 15 October 2004, during the second Test of Australia's series against India at Chennai, he broke the record for most career wickets in Test cricket. Warne's dismissal of Irfan Pathan, who was caught at slip by Matthew Hayden, saw him overtake his Sri Lankan rival Muttiah Muralitharan with 533 wickets. Muralitharan, who was injured at the time, had taken the record from Courtney Walsh five months earlier. Australia won the series 2–1; it was Australia's first series win in India since 1969. Warne's 14 wickets at an average of 30.07 was an improvement on his previous performances in India, when in six Tests he took 20 wickets at an average of 52 runs each. For his performances in 2004, the ICC named him in the World Test XI.

On 11 August 2005 in the Third Ashes Test at Old Trafford, Warne became the first bowler in history to take 600 Test wickets. In 2005, with 96 wickets, Warne broke the record for the number of wickets in a calendar year. Warne's ferocious competitiveness was a feature of the 2005 Ashes series in which he took 40 wickets at an average of 19.92 and scored 249 runs. Warne shared the player of the series honour with England's Andrew Flintoff. For his performances in 2005, the ICC named Warne in the World Test XI.

International retirement (2006–2007)

Warne began the 2006–07 Ashes series with an indifferent Test performance in Brisbane and a poor performance in the first innings in Adelaide, where he took no wickets. His second-innings performance, however, including bowling Kevin Pietersen around the legs, triggered England's fifth-day collapse and Australia's win. Warne again bowled well in the third Test's second innings, and took the final wicket of Monty Panesar as Australia regained the Ashes.

On 21 December 2006, Warne announced he would retire at the end of the 2006–07 Ashes series at SCG. In his penultimate Test, he took his 700th Test wicket on 26 December 2006 by bowling out English batsman Andrew Strauss at MCG in his final appearance there. This was the first occasion a player had taken 700 Test wickets. The wicket was described as a "classic Warne dismissal", which the crowd of 89,155 gave a standing ovation.

Warne's final Test was held at SCG, same venue as his first 15 years earlier. Warne ended England's first innings by trapping Monty Panesar leg before wicket for a duck and took his 1,000th international wicket. Warne's final Test wicket was that of England's all-rounder Andrew Flintoff, who was stumped by Adam Gilchrist. Warne is one of only two bowlers to have taken more than 1,000 wickets in international cricket, the other being Muttiah Muralitharan. For his performances in 2006, the ICC and Cricinfo named Warne in the World Test XI. Also in 2006, the ACB—which was now renamed Cricket Australia (CA)—awarded Warne the Men's Test Player of the Year at the Allan Border Medal ceremony.

Twenty20 career (2008–2013)

After his retirement from international cricket, Warne was signed as the captain of Rajasthan Royals in the Indian Premier League (IPL) 2008, fetching US$450,000 in the pre-season player auction. Warne led the Royals to victory in the first season of the competition. He continued as captain of the Royals for a further four seasons; the 2011 season was his last with the franchise.

Warne was signed as a player for Melbourne Stars in Australia's inaugural Big Bash League (BBL) in November 2011. The Stars qualified for the semi-finals of the tournament, in which Warne took seven wickets in eight matches at an economy rate of 6.74 runs conceded per over.

In 2013, Warne was fined $4500 and banned for one match for using obscene language, making "inappropriate physical contact with a player or official" Marlon Samuels and "showing serious dissent at an umpire's decision" during a BBL match against Melbourne Renegades. In July 2013, Warne officially retired from all formats of cricket, confirming he would no longer captain Melbourne Stars in the BBL.

In July 2014, Warne captained the Rest of the World side in the Bicentenary Celebration match at Lord's. In February 2018, Rajasthan Royals appointed Warne as their team mentor for the IPL 2018.

Wider influence on cricket
Warne is widely considered as one of the greatest bowlers in cricket history. He revolutionised cricket with his mastery of leg spin, which many cricket followers had come to regard as a dying art due to the difficulty of accurately bowling the deliveries. Warne helped overturn the domination of cricket by fast bowling that had prevailed for twenty years before his debut. In the early 1970s, Australia's fast bowlers Dennis Lillee and Jeff Thomson dominated cricket. From around 1977 until the early 1990s, the West Indies lost only one ill-tempered and controversial Test series with a bowling attack almost exclusively composed of four fast bowlers. From the early 1990s, with the West Indies in decline, Waqar Younis and Wasim Akram of Pakistan were becoming the world's most-feared fast-bowling combination. In this context, Warne's bowling became significant. His dominance, particularly of English and South African batsmen, provided cricket audiences with an alternative skill.

Many of Warne's most spectacular performances occurred in Ashes series against England; in particular, the "Gatting Ball", otherwise known as the "Ball of the Century", which drifted significantly out of the hand, pitching well outside Leg Stump and sharply spun past the front of the bat, clipping the top of Off Stump, bowling a bemused Mike Gatting in the 1993 Ashes series. Warne had struggled against India, particularly against Sachin Tendulkar; Warne's bowling average against India was 47.18 runs per wicket compared with his overall average of 25. Warne also was hit for the most sixes by the time he retired; Warne said he did not like to be hit for singles because he had to plan for two batsmen at the same over.

Playing style
According to Warne:

Warne combined the ability to prodigiously turn the ball, even on unhelpful pitches, with regular accuracy and a variation of deliveries—notable among these is the flipper. In the later stages of his career, variation was less evident despite regular press conferences announcing a "new" delivery for each series he participated in. When Warne retired, Australian journalist Gideon Haigh wrote: "It was said of Augustus that he found Rome brick and left it marble: the same is true of Warne and spin bowling". Warne did this by having a relaxed "two-finger-up, two-down grip" of the ball and not hitting it against the top part of the palm.

Warne was a fierce and dramatic competitor. Gideon Haigh wrote about what he called Warne's pageantry and measured theatricality, including his exaggerated appeals, intimidation of batters, sledging, flirting with umpires, and time-wasting, all of which added to his competitiveness. Warne said the "part of the art of bowling spin is to make the batsman think that something special is happening even when it isn't".

Warne was an effective lower-order batter; he was once dismissed for 99 with a reckless shot on what was later shown to be a no-ball. Warne has scored the most Test runs without having scored a century; his top scores were 99 and 91. He also scored the third-most international Test ducks. Of players who have batted in more than 175 Test innings, Warne's proportion of dismissals by being bowled out is the lowest, at under seven per cent.

Warne was a successful slip fielder; he made 125 catches—the 19th-most catches as a fielder in Test cricket history.

Performance analysis

Shane Warne was the third-highest five-wicket haul-taker in international cricket, after Muttiah Muralitharan and Richard Hadlee. He took 37 Test fivers and a single ODI fiver, along with 10 Test ten-wicket hauls.

Test matches

Test 10-wicket hauls

Career-best performances

Commentator
After his retirement, Warne became a television cricket commentator. On 13 July 2005, Nine Network announced it would not renew his commentating contract, for which he was paid around A$300,000 annually, due to incidents in his private life. He rejoined Nine in 2008 and continued as a member of its commentary team until Nine lost the broadcasting rights in 2018. Warne was also signed by Sky Sports in 2009 and Fox Cricket in 2018. He worked for both Sky and Fox until his death.

Outside cricket
Warne joined Muttiah Muralitharan in humanitarian efforts to help Sri Lankans who were adversely affected by the 2004 Indian Ocean earthquake and tsunami. His charity the Shane Warne Foundation donated AU$20,000 to help rebuild Galle International Stadium. Warne was named in the World XI squad during the World Cricket Tsunami Appeal tournament, which was held in Melbourne on 10 January 2005 to raise funds for post-tsunami humanitarian relief efforts.

Warne made a cameo appearance on the Australian sitcom Kath & Kim in 2007. He also appeared on BBC Television panel game A Question of Sport, taking on the captaincy for three shows and appearing regularly.

In January 2008, Warne signed a two-year agreement with 888poker to represent them at international poker events, including the Aussie Millions, World Series of Poker and the 888 UK Poker Open. This sponsorship agreement ended in January 2015.

In 2010, Nine Network commissioned a chat show titled Warnie, which was hosted by Warne. The program debuted on 24 November 2010 with Warne interviewing James Packer. Celebrities interviewed on the program included the captain of the Australian cricket team Ricky Ponting, and singers Chris Martin and Susan Boyle. 
Warne also did promotional work for hair-loss-recovery company Advanced Hair; the British Advertising Standards Authority (ASA) investigated this matter in relation to an illegal celebrity endorsement of medical services.

Personal life

From 1999 to 2005, Warne was married to Simone Callahan, with whom he had children Summer, Jackson and Brooke. In 2000, Warne lost the Australian vice-captaincy after it was discovered he was sending sexual text messages to a British nurse while still married to Callahan. He was also involved in an altercation with some teenage boys who took a photograph of him smoking after he had accepted sponsorship from a nicotine patch company in return for quitting smoking. In April 2007, Warne and Callahan were reported to be reuniting two years after their divorce. Five months later, however, Callahan again left Warne after he inadvertently sent her a text message he had intended for another woman.

Following his split from Callahan, Warne dated English actress Elizabeth Hurley. Although their relationship at first seemed short-lived following the disclosure that Warne was sending sexual messages to a married Melbourne businesswoman, the couple created a media frenzy when Hurley moved into Warne's mansion in Brighton, Victoria. In late 2011, Hurley and Warne announced they were engaged, but they had cancelled the engagement by December 2013. Warne later said, "I was more in love with Elizabeth than I'd realised I could be. I miss the love we had. My years with Elizabeth were the happiest of my life."

After retiring from cricket, Warne worked for the Shane Warne Foundation, which assisted seriously ill and underprivileged children. The charity was launched in 2004 and distributed £400,000; its activities included a charity poker tournament. The charity closed in 2017 after running at a financial loss for four of the five previous years. In 2014, the foundation raised $465,000 but spent $550,000.

In August 2021, Warne contracted COVID-19 and was placed on a ventilator "to make sure there were no longer-lasting effects". He said, "I had a thumping headache and I had one day where I had the shivers, but sweating, like when you have the flu", and that Australians would have to learn to live with the virus. Warne was born with complete heterochromia, giving him a blue right eye and a green left eye.

Death
On 4 March 2022, at the age of 52, Warne died of a heart attack due to atherosclerosis while holidaying on the island Ko Samui, Thailand. Warne died on the same day as fellow Australian cricketer Rod Marsh, to whom Warne paid tribute on Twitter a few hours before his own death. Six days after Warne's death, his body was returned from Thailand to Melbourne on a private aeroplane.

Warne's private funeral took place on 20 March 2022 in Melbourne at Moorabbin Oval, the headquarters and former home ground of St Kilda Football Club. The mourners were led by Warne's parents and three children, and some former teammates were in attendance. On 30 March, Warne was publicly honoured at a state memorial event at Melbourne Cricket Ground.

Tributes

Australian teammates Adam Gilchrist, Jason Gillespie, Matthew Hayden, Andrew Symonds, Brett Lee, Darren Lehmann, Glenn McGrath, Tom Moody, Ricky Ponting and Shane Watson, as well as Australian Test captain Pat Cummins and Australian limited-overs captain Aaron Finch remembered Warne.

Outside Australia, many former and current cricketers also paid tribute, including England's Kevin Pietersen and Michael Vaughan; India's Sachin Tendulkar and Virat Kohli; New Zealand's Brendon McCullum and Kane Williamson; Pakistan's Wasim Akram and Waqar Younis; South Africa's Graeme Smith; and West Indies' Brian Lara. Indian commentator Harsha Bhogle also offered a tribute.

To commemorate Warne, the Australian women's cricket team wore black armbands in their first 2022 Women's Cricket World Cup game against England. A similar tribute was held by the Australian men's cricket team on the second day of the first Test against Pakistan, with both teams observing a minute of silence before the day's play.

Celebrities, including Warne's close friend Chris Martin of Coldplay, Russell Crowe, Mick Jagger, Elton John, Ed Sheeran and Magda Szubanski, also paid their respects. Warne's former fiancée Elizabeth Hurley said: "I feel like the sun has gone behind a cloud forever. RIP my beloved lionheart." Fans ornamented the statue of Warne at MCG with flowers, beer, baked beans, meat pies and cigarettes.

Warne's former Big Bash League team, the Melbourne Stars paid tribute to Warne during their game against the Hobart Hurricanes. During the match, all the Stars players wore Warne's number 23, and a standing ovation took place after the 23rd ball of the game. The Stars retired the number 23 following the game.

State memorial service 

Warne's state memorial service was held on the evening of 30 March 2022 at Melbourne Cricket Ground. The service, which was free to attend and ran for around 140 minutes, was attended by about 55,000 people, broadcast on multiple channels and streamed online. The service was ultimately watched by more than 1.5 million Australians.

The memorial was opened by Greta Bradman, Donald Bradman's granddaughter, who performed the national anthem "Advance Australia Fair"; the service included eulogies from Warne's children, his father, his brother Jason, and other family members and friends. During his eulogy, Warne's father said, "Shane said of himself, 'I smoked, I drank, and I played a little cricket.

It was earlier decided the Great Southern Stand at MCG was to be renamed in Warne's honour. To conclude the memorial, Warne's children unveiled the Shane Warne Stand sign with a recording of Frank Sinatra singing "My Way" playing in the background as the crowd rose and cheered.

Awards and recognition

In 2000, a panel of cricket experts chose Warne as one of five Wisden Cricketers of the Century, the only specialist bowler selected and the only one who was still playing at the time. The same publication named Warne in an all-time Test World XI and he was the Wisden Leading Cricketer in the World in 1997 and 2004.

In 2004, Warne was included as part of Richie Benaud's Greatest XI, a team chosen by Richie Benaud that compares players across all teams and eras using statistics and personal testimonials. Warne was chosen as the best spin bowler of all time by both Benaud and the Australian public, with 85% of respondents in agreement. In 2005, Warne was named the BBC Overseas Sports Personality of the Year.

In 2007, Cricket Australia and Sri Lanka Cricket decided to name the Australia–Sri Lanka Test cricket series the Warne–Muralitharan Trophy in honour of Warne and Muttiah Muralitharan. Also in 2007, Cricket Australia named Warne in their greatest ODI XI of all time. In 2009, Warne was awarded honorary life membership of Marylebone Cricket Club.

On 22 December 2011, a statue honouring Warne was unveiled outside MCG. The bronze statue was sculpted by Louis Laumen and depicts Warne during his bowling action and has an inscription highlighting his cricketing career. Warne, who was present at the sculpture's unveiling, stated: "It's a great honour, it's a bit weird seeing yourself up there but I'm very proud."

In 2012, a grandstand at the Rose Bowl, where Warne played county cricket for Hampshire, was named the Shane Warne Stand. In 2012, he was also inducted into the Cricket Hall of Fame by Cricket Australia. In 2013, Warne was inducted into the ICC Cricket Hall of Fame. In a fan poll conducted by the Cricketers' Almanack in 2017, Warne was named in Australia's best Ashes XI of the previous 40 years.

In June 2022, on the Queen's Birthday Honours list, Warne was posthumously appointed as an Officer of the Order of Australia (AO) for his service to cricket and philanthropic contributions. In December 2022,  Warne was elevated to a Legend in the Sport Australia Hall of Fame.

In popular culture
In September 2022 it was reported that Australia's Nine Network had begun work on Warnie, a two-part biopic about Warne's life, within weeks of his death, describing the film as a fitting tribute. But friends and family of Warne described the project as insensitive and urged the broadcaster to scrap the film, feeling it was too soon after his death to make a film.

References

Sources
 My Illustrated Career by Shane Warne (Cassell Illustrated, 2006) ISBN 1-84403-543-3
 Shane Warne's Century – My Top 100 Cricketers by Shane Warne (Mainstream Publishing, 2008)

External links

 Official website
 

 
1969 births
2022 deaths
20th-century Australian people
21st-century Australian people
Australia One Day International cricketers
Australia Test cricketers
Australian cricket captains
Australian cricket coaches
Australian cricket commentators
Australian Cricket Hall of Fame inductees
Australian cricketers
Australian expatriate cricketers in the United Kingdom
Australian expatriate sportspeople in England
Australian expatriate sportspeople in India
Australian Institute of Sport cricketers
Australian memoirists
Australian people of Cornish descent
Australian people of German descent
Australian poker players
Australian sportspeople in doping cases
BBC Sports Personality World Sport Star of the Year winners
Cricketers at the 1996 Cricket World Cup
Cricketers at the 1999 Cricket World Cup
Cricketers from Melbourne
Deaths in Thailand
Doping cases in Australian cricket
Hampshire cricket captains
Hampshire cricketers
I'm a Celebrity...Get Me Out of Here! (Australian TV series) participants
ICC World XI One Day International cricketers
Indian Premier League coaches
Melbourne Stars cricketers
Officers of the Order of Australia
People educated at Mentone Grammar School
Rajasthan Royals cricketers
Sport Australia Hall of Fame inductees
Test cricket hat-trick takers
Victoria cricketers
Wisden Cricketers of the Century
Wisden Cricketers of the Year
Wisden Leading Cricketers in the World